RPJ may refer to:

 Rajpura Junction railway station (Indian Railways station code), Punjab, India
 Rochelle Municipal Airport (FAA LID code), Illinois, US